Portuguese America, sometimes called  or Lusophone America in the English language, in contrast to Anglo-America, French America or Hispanic America, is the Portuguese-speaking community of people and their diaspora, notably those tracing back origins to Brazil and the early Portuguese colonization of the Americas.

Portugal colonized parts of South America (Brazil; Colónia do Sacramento, Uruguay; Guanare, Venezuela), but also made some unsuccessful attempts to colonize North America (Newfoundland and Labrador and Nova Scotia in Canada).
  
Brazil is however the centre of the community and is the point of origin of most of Portuguese America. It also includes communities all over the Americas and languages derived from Portuguese as it is Papiamento spoken on Aruba, Bonaire, and Curaçao; Saramaccan of Suriname or Cupópia of Brazil which is nearly extinct.

Because Portuguese is a Romance language, Portuguese America (specifically Brazil) is considered to be part of Latin America in some sources, but this term more often refers to Hispanic America since Brazil is not culturally close enough to Hispanic America in general other than by language proximity.

References

Regions of the Americas
Portuguese language in the Americas
Latin America
Ibero-America